The 1872 United States presidential election in New Hampshire took place on November 5, 1872. All contemporary 37 states were part of the 1872 United States presidential election. The state voters chose five electors to the Electoral College, which selected the president and vice president.

New Hampshire was won by the Republican nominees, incumbent President Ulysses S. Grant of Illinois and his running mate Senator Henry Wilson of Massachusetts. Grant and Wilson defeated the Liberal Republican and Democratic nominees, former Congressman Horace Greeley of New York and his running mate former Senator and Governor Benjamin Gratz Brown of Missouri by a margin of 8.33%.

Horace Greeley had been born in New Hampshire. More specifically, in the town of Amherst.

Results

See also
 United States presidential elections in New Hampshire

References

New Hampshire
1872
1872 New Hampshire elections